The 1924–25 Divizia A was the thirteenth season of Divizia A, the top-level football league of Romania.

Participating teams

Final Tournament of Regions

Preliminary round

1 The team from Sibiu failed to appear, so it lost the game with 0–3, by administrative decision.

Quarters

1 Fulgerul was disqualified, the result being annulled.

2 Interrupted.

Semifinals

Final
August 9, 1925, Arad

References

Liga I seasons
Romania
1924–25 in Romanian football